Clara Monika Bakale (born May 15, 1979) is a 3-time Olympic swimmer from the Republic of the Congo. Bakale represented the Congo at the 1996, 2000 and  2004 Olympics.

She is the sister of fellow swimmer Rony Bakale.
She's a welding engineer working for TOTAL E& P

External links
 Yahoo! Sports profile

1979 births
Living people
Republic of the Congo female swimmers
Olympic swimmers of the Republic of the Congo
Swimmers at the 1996 Summer Olympics
Swimmers at the 2000 Summer Olympics
Swimmers at the 2004 Summer Olympics